Johannes "Hannes" Reichelt  (born 5 July 1980) is a retired Austrian World Cup alpine ski racer. He competed mainly in downhill and super-G, as well as in giant slalom.

Biography
Born in Altenmarkt im Pongau in Salzburg, Reichelt made his World Cup debut in December 2001. He made his first podium in December 2002 and won his first World Cup race, a super-G, in December 2005. Reichelt also won the Europa Cup overall title in 2005, as well as the Europa Cup season title in giant slalom in 2003.

Reichelt won the World Cup season title in the Super G in 2008, a single point ahead of runner-up  Didier Cuche. Reichelt won the final Super G event of the season by one-hundredth of a second to claim the globe. At the 2015 World Championships, he won the gold medal in the Super G, to go along with his silver medal in the Super G at the 2011 World Championships.

Although without a victory in the 2012 season, Reichelt attained seven World Cup podiums in three disciplines, and had his best career finishes in the season standings for the overall, downhill (4th), and giant slalom (5th).

Through December 2020, Reichelt has thirteen World Cup victories and 44 podiums. He announced his retirement after not being qualified for finals in both speed disciplines at the 2021 season.

World Cup results

Season titles

Season standings

Race podiums
 13 wins - (6 DH, 6 SG, 1 GS)
 44 podiums - (19 DH, 20 SG, 5 GS)

World Championship results

Olympic results

References

External links
 
 
 Hannes Reichelt at the Austrian Ski team official site 

 

1980 births
Living people
People from St. Johann im Pongau District
Austrian male alpine skiers
Olympic alpine skiers of Austria
Alpine skiers at the 2006 Winter Olympics
Alpine skiers at the 2018 Winter Olympics
FIS Alpine Ski World Cup champions
Sportspeople from Salzburg (state)